New Orleans Baby Doll Ladies is a dance group founded by Millisia White. This group was founded in 2005 when Hurricane Katrina hit USA. This group performs Baby Doll march in Zulu parade at Mardi Gras  and Macy's Thanksgiving Day Parade in New York City. The tradition of Baby Doll march has started in 1912 by groups of women in New Orleans’ red-light district, who marched in streets and dressed as dolls.

References 

Mardi Gras in New Orleans